Lamaline is a town in the Canadian province of Newfoundland and Labrador. The town had a population of 480 in 1940, 643 in 1956 and 218 in the Canada 2021 Census. Lamaline was a small place with 10 families in 1864. The Way Office was established in 1863 and the first Waymaster was James Pittman.

Demographics 

See also
 Allan's Island, Newfoundland and Labrador
 List of cities and towns in Newfoundland and Labrador

References

Towns in Newfoundland and Labrador